In mathematics, an affine space is a geometric structure that generalizes some of the properties of Euclidean spaces in such a way that these are independent of the concepts of distance and measure of angles, keeping only the properties related to parallelism and ratio of lengths for parallel line segments.

In an affine space, there is no distinguished point that serves as an origin. Hence, no vector has a fixed origin and no vector can be uniquely associated to a point. In an affine space, there are instead displacement vectors, also called translation vectors or simply translations, between two points of the space. Thus it makes sense to subtract two points of the space, giving a translation vector, but it does not make sense to add two points of the space. Likewise, it makes sense to add a displacement vector to a point of an affine space, resulting in a new point translated from the starting point by that vector.

Any vector space may be viewed as an affine space; this amounts to forgetting the special role played by the zero vector. In this case, elements of the vector space may be viewed either as points of the affine space or as displacement vectors or translations. When considered as a point, the zero vector is called the origin. Adding a fixed vector to the elements of a linear subspace (vector subspace) of a vector space produces an affine subspace. One commonly says that this affine subspace has been obtained by translating (away from the origin) the linear subspace by the translation vector (the vector added to all the elements of the linear space). In finite dimensions, such an affine subspace is the solution set of an inhomogeneous linear system. The displacement vectors for that affine space are the solutions of the corresponding homogeneous linear system, which is a linear subspace. Linear subspaces, in contrast, always contain the origin of the vector space.

The dimension of an affine space is defined as the dimension of the vector space of its translations. An affine space of dimension one is an affine line. An affine space of dimension 2 is an affine plane. An affine subspace of dimension  in an affine space or a vector space of dimension  is an affine hyperplane.

Informal description 

The following characterization may be easier to understand than the usual formal definition: an affine space is what is left of a vector space after one has forgotten which point is the origin (or, in the words of the French mathematician Marcel Berger, "An affine space is nothing more than a vector space whose origin we try to forget about, by adding translations to the linear maps"). Imagine that Alice knows that a certain point is the actual origin, but Bob believes that another point—call it —is the origin.
 .

However, if the sum of the coefficients in a linear combination is 1, then Alice and Bob will arrive at the same answer.

If Alice travels to
 
then Bob can similarly travel to
 .

Under this condition, for all coefficients , Alice and Bob describe the same point with the same linear combination, despite using different origins.

While only Alice knows the "linear structure", both Alice and Bob know the "affine structure"—i.e. the values of affine combinations, defined as linear combinations in which the sum of the coefficients is 1. A set with an affine structure is an affine space.

Definition 
The elements of the affine space  are called points. The vector space  is said to be associated to the affine space, and its elements are called vectors, translations, or sometimes free vectors.

Explicitly, the definition above means that the action is a mapping, generally denoted as an addition,
 
that has the following properties.
 Right identity:
 , where  is the zero vector in 
 Associativity:
  (here the last  is the addition in )
 Free and transitive action:
 For every , the mapping  is a bijection.

The first two properties are simply defining properties of a (right) group action. The third property characterizes free and transitive actions, the onto character coming from transitivity, and then the injective character follows from the action being free. There is a fourth property that follows from 1, 2 above:
Existence of one-to-one translations
For all , the mapping  is a bijection.

Property 3 is often used in the following equivalent form (the 5th property).
Subtraction:
Another way to express the definition is that an affine space is a principal homogeneous space for the action of the additive group of a vector space. Homogeneous spaces are by definition endowed with a transitive group action, and for a principal homogeneous space such a transitive action is by definition free.

Subtraction and Weyl's axioms 
 
Existence follows from the transitivity of the action, and uniqueness follows because the action is free.

This subtraction has the two following properties, called Weyl's axioms:
 , there is a unique point  such that 
 

In Euclidean geometry, the second of Weyl's axiom is commonly called the parallelogram rule.

Affine spaces can be equivalently defined as a point set , together with a vector space , and a subtraction satisfying Weyl's axioms. In this case, the addition of a vector to a point is defined from the first of Weyl's axioms.

Affine subspaces and parallelism 

 

The linear subspace associated with an affine subspace is often called its , and two subspaces that share the same direction are said to be parallel.

This implies the following generalization of Playfair's axiom: Given a direction , for any point  of  there is one and only one affine subspace of direction , which passes through , namely the subspace .

Every translation  maps any affine subspace to a parallel subspace.

The term parallel is also used for two affine subspaces such that the direction of one is included in the direction of the other.

Affine map 
 
such that
 
is a well defined linear map. By  being well defined is meant that  implies  .

This implies that, for a point  and a vector , one has
 

Endomorphisms 

An affine transformation or endomorphism of an affine space  is an affine map from that space to itself. Another important family of examples are the linear maps centred at an origin: given a point  and a linear map , one may define an affine map  by

Vector spaces as affine spaces 
Every vector space  may be considered as an affine space over itself. This means that every element of  may be considered either as a point or as a vector.

In other words, the choice of an origin  in  allows us to identify  and  up to a canonical isomorphism. The counterpart of this property is that the affine space  may be identified with the vector space  in which "the place of the origin has been forgotten".

Relation to Euclidean spaces

Definition of Euclidean spaces 
Euclidean spaces (including the one-dimensional line, two-dimensional plane, and three-dimensional space commonly studied in elementary geometry, as well as higher-dimensional analogues) are affine spaces.

Indeed, in most modern definitions, a Euclidean space is defined to be an affine space, such that the associated vector space is a real inner product space of finite dimension, that is a vector space over the reals with a positive-definite quadratic form .
 
 

It is straightforward to verify that the vectors form a vector space, the square of the Euclidean distance is a quadratic form on the space of vectors, and the two definitions of Euclidean spaces are equivalent.

Affine properties 
In Euclidean geometry, the common phrase "affine property" refers to a property that can be proved in affine spaces, that is, it can be proved without using the quadratic form and its associated inner product. In other words, an affine property is a property that does not involve lengths and angles. Typical examples are parallelism, and the definition of a tangent. A non-example is the definition of a normal.

Equivalently, an affine property is a property that is invariant under affine transformations of the Euclidean space.

Affine combinations and barycenter 
Let  be a collection of  points in an affine space, and  be  elements of the ground field.

Suppose that . For any two points  and  one has
 
Thus, this sum is independent of the choice of the origin, and the resulting vector may be denoted
 

When , one retrieves the definition of the subtraction of points.

Now suppose instead that the field elements satisfy . For some choice of an origin , denote by  the unique point such that
 
Therefore, if
 
one may write
 

Examples 
The vacuum energy when it is defined picks out a canonical origin.
 Any coset of a subspace  of a vector space is an affine space over that subspace.
 The solutions of an inhomogeneous linear differential equation form an affine space over the solutions of the corresponding homogeneous linear equation.
 The space of connections (viewed from the vector bundle , where  is a smooth manifold) is an affine space for the vector space of  valued 1-forms. The space of connections (viewed from the principal bundle ) is an affine space for the vector space of -valued 1-forms, where  is the associated adjoint bundle.

Affine span and bases
It is the intersection of all affine subspaces containing , and its direction is the intersection of the directions of the affine subspaces that contain .

An  or barycentric frame (see , below) of an affine space is a generating set that is also independent (that is a minimal generating set).

Recall that the dimension of an affine space is the dimension of its associated vector space. The bases of an affine space of finite dimension  are the independent subsets of  elements, or, equivalently, the generating subsets of  elements. Equivalently, } is an affine basis of an affine space if and only if } is a linear basis of the associated vector space.

Coordinates
There are two strongly related kinds of coordinate systems that may be defined on affine spaces.

Barycentric coordinates 

The properties of an affine basis imply that for every  in  there is a unique -tuple  of elements of  such that
 
and
 

The barycentric coordinates define an affine isomorphism between the affine space  and the affine subspace of  defined by the equation .

For affine spaces of infinite dimension, the same definition applies, using only finite sums. This means that for each point, only a finite number of coordinates are non-zero.

Affine coordinates 
An affine frame of an affine space consists of a point, called the origin, and a linear basis of the associated vector space.

 
or equivalently
 

Example: In Euclidean geometry, Cartesian coordinates are affine coordinates relative to an orthonormal frame, that is an affine frame  such that  is an orthonormal basis.

Relationship between barycentric and affine coordinates 
Barycentric coordinates and affine coordinates are strongly related, and may be considered as equivalent.

In fact, given a barycentric frame
 
one deduces immediately the affine frame
 
and, if
 
are the barycentric coordinates of a point over the barycentric frame, then the affine coordinates of the same point over the affine frame are
 

Conversely, if
 
is an affine frame, then
 
is a barycentric frame. If
 
are the affine coordinates of a point over the affine frame, then its barycentric coordinates over the barycentric frame are
 

Therefore, barycentric and affine coordinates are almost equivalent. In most applications, affine coordinates are preferred, as involving less coordinates that are independent. However, in the situations where the important points of the studied problem are affinely independent, barycentric coordinates may lead to simpler computation, as in the following example.

Example of the triangle 
The vertices of a non-flat triangle form an affine basis of the Euclidean plane. The barycentric coordinates allows easy characterization of the elements of the triangle that do not involve angles or distances:

The lines supporting the edges are the points that have a zero coordinate. The edges themselves are the points that have one zero coordinate and two nonnegative coordinates. The interior of the triangle are the points whose coordinates are all positive. The medians are the points that have two equal coordinates, and the centroid is the point of coordinates .

Change of coordinates

Case of affine coordinates

Case of barycentric coordinates

Properties of affine homomorphisms

Matrix representation

Image and fibers
Let
 
be an affine homomorphism, with
 
as associated linear map.

As an affine space does not have a zero element, an affine homomorphism does not have a kernel.

Projection

An important example is the projection parallel to some direction onto an affine subspace. The importance of this example lies in the fact that Euclidean spaces are affine spaces, and that these kinds of projections are fundamental in Euclidean geometry.

 

This is an affine homomorphism whose associated linear map  is defined by
 

Quotient space 
Although kernels are not defined for affine spaces, quotient spaces are defined. This results from the fact that "belonging to the same fiber of an affine homomorphism" is an equivalence relation.

Let   be an affine space, and   be a linear subspace of the associated vector space .
 
This quotient is an affine space, which has  as associated vector space.

This is the first isomorphism theorem for affine spaces.

Axioms 
Affine spaces are usually studied by analytic geometry using coordinates, or equivalently vector spaces. They can also be studied as synthetic geometry by writing down axioms, though this approach is much less common. There are several different systems of axioms for affine space.

 axiomatizes the special case of affine geometry over the reals as ordered geometry together with an affine form of Desargues's theorem and an axiom stating that in a plane there is at most one line through a given point not meeting a given line.

Affine planes satisfy the following axioms :
(in which two lines are called parallel if they are equal or
disjoint):
 Any two distinct points lie on a unique line.
 Given a point  and line  there is a unique line which contains the point and is parallel to the line
 There exist three non-collinear points.
As well as affine planes over fields (or division rings), there are also many non-Desarguesian planes satisfying these axioms.  gives axioms for higher-dimensional affine spaces.

Purely axiomatic affine geometry is more general than affine spaces and is treated in a separate article.

Relation to projective spaces 

Affine spaces are contained in projective spaces.  For example, an affine plane can be obtained from any projective plane by removing one line and all the points on it, and conversely any affine plane can be used to construct a projective plane as a closure by adding a line at infinity whose points correspond to equivalence classes of parallel lines.  Similar constructions hold in higher dimensions.

Further, transformations of projective space that preserve affine space (equivalently, that leave the hyperplane at infinity invariant as a set) yield transformations of affine space. Conversely, any affine linear transformation extends uniquely to a projective linear transformation, so the affine group is a subgroup of the projective group. For instance, Möbius transformations (transformations of the complex projective line, or Riemann sphere) are affine (transformations of the complex plane) if and only if they fix the point at infinity.

Affine algebraic geometry 
In algebraic geometry, an affine variety (or, more generally, an affine algebraic set) is defined as the subset of an affine space that is the set of the common zeros of a set of so-called polynomial functions over the affine space. For defining a polynomial function over the affine space, one has to choose an affine frame. Then, a polynomial function is a function such that the image of any point is the value of some multivariate polynomial function of the coordinates of the point. As a change of affine coordinates may be expressed by linear functions (more precisely affine functions) of the coordinates, this definition is independent of a particular choice of coordinates.

As the whole affine space is the set of the common zeros of the zero polynomial, affine spaces are affine algebraic varieties.

Ring of polynomial functions 

The total degree defines also a graduation, but it depends on the choice of coordinates, as a change of affine coordinates may map indeterminates on non-homogeneous polynomials.

Zariski topology 

Affine spaces over topological fields, such as the real or the complex numbers, have a natural topology. The Zariski topology, which is defined for affine spaces over any field, allows use of topological methods in any case. Zariski topology is the unique topology on an affine space whose closed sets are affine algebraic sets (that is sets of the common zeros of polynomial functions over the affine set). As, over a topological field, polynomial functions are continuous, every Zariski closed set is closed for the usual topology, if any. In other words, over a topological field, Zariski topology is coarser than the natural topology.

There is a natural injective function from an affine space into the set of prime ideals (that is the spectrum) of its ring of polynomial functions. When affine coordinates have been chosen, this function maps the point of coordinates  to the maximal ideal . This function is a homeomorphism (for the Zariski topology of the affine space and of the spectrum of the ring of polynomial functions) of the affine space onto the image of the function.

The case of an algebraically closed ground field is especially important in algebraic geometry, because, in this case, the homeomorphism above is a map between the affine space and the set of all maximal ideals of the ring of functions (this is Hilbert's Nullstellensatz).

This is the starting idea of scheme theory of Grothendieck, which consists, for studying algebraic varieties, of considering as "points", not only the points of the affine space, but also all the prime ideals of the spectrum. This allows gluing together algebraic varieties in a similar way as, for manifolds, charts are glued together for building a manifold.

Cohomology 
Like all affine varieties, local data on an affine space can always be patched together globally: the cohomology of affine space is trivial. More precisely,  for all coherent sheaves F, and integers . This property is also enjoyed by all other affine varieties. But also all of the étale cohomology groups on affine space are trivial. In particular, every line bundle is trivial. More generally, the Quillen–Suslin theorem implies that every algebraic vector bundle over an affine space is trivial.

See also 
 
 
 
 
 Barycentric coordinate system

Notes

References 
 
 
 
 
 
 
 
 
 

Affine geometry
Linear algebra
Space (mathematics)